The Valea lui Stan is a right tributary of the river Argeș in Romania. It flows into the Argeș downstream of the Vidraru Dam.

References

Rivers of Romania
Rivers of Argeș County